Daviesia arborea, commonly known as golden pea or bitterleaf pea, is a species of flowering plant in the family Fabaceae and is endemic to eastern Australia. It is a shrub or small tree with weeping branches, linear phyllodes and yellow flowers with red markings.

Description

Taxonomy and naming
Daviesia arborea was first formally described in 1805 by W.Hill in his book Collection of Queensland Timbers - Melbourne International Exhibition of 1880. The specific epithet (arborea) means "tree" or "tree-like".

Distribution
Golden pea mostly grows in moist forest on coastal hills and mountains slopes from the Bunya Mountains in south-east Queensland to near Comboyne in New South Wales.

Use in horticulture
This large shrub is an attractive plant with it drooping branches and clusters of sweet-smelling flowers in spring. It can be grown from scarified seed and grows best in semi-shaded, moist situation in well-drained soil.

References

arborea
Flora of New South Wales
Flora of Queensland
Plants described in 1880